Harold Edgar Coyle, RIAI, was architect of Dún Laoghaire and Dublin and pupil or assistant of Sir Thomas Drew, for whom he supervised the execution in 1911 of the brass memorial tablet in Christ Church Cathedral, Dublin by the firm of Sharpe & Emery. Born in County Dublin, he moved to England around 1925. He was a member of the AAI from 1903 to 1913; Royal Institute of Architects in Ireland from  1919 to 1929, 1940-1946.

References

1883 births
Architects from Dublin (city)
People from County Dublin
Year of death missing